The 2008 Martyr's Memorial B-Division League was the 2008 season of the Martyr's Memorial B-Division League. A total of 9 teams competed in the league. The season began on 9 September 2008 and concluded on 29 September February 2006. Swayambhu Club won the league and was promoted along with Himalayan Sherpa Club, Bansbari Club, and Koilapani Polestar Club. Being based in Nawalparasi, Koilapani would therefore become the first ever team from outside the Kathmandu Valley to be promoted to the A-Division League.

Teams

League table

Controversy
On 18 September 2008, in a match against Kathmandu Club, players and officials of Kumari Youth Club attacked and beat referee Sachin Amatya, for which the match was abandoned in the 34th minute. All Nepal Football Association sanctioned multiple of  Kumari Youth Club's players and officials, including suspension of the team's captain Bikash Gurung for two years.

References

Martyr's Memorial B-Division League seasons
2008 in Nepalese sport